Cash concentration is the transfer of funds from diverse accounts into a central account to improve the efficiency of cash management. The consolidation of cash into a single account allows a company to maintain smaller cash balances overall, and to identify excess cash available for short term investments.

The cash available in different bank accounts are pooled into a master account. The advantages of cash concentration are 
 Cash control
 Cash visibility

Corporate finance
Corporate development
Cash flow